National Historic Site (NHS) is a designation for an officially recognized area of national historic significance in the United States. They are usually owned and managed by the federal government. An NHS usually contains a single historical feature directly associated with its subject. The National Historical Park (NHP) is an area that generally extends beyond single properties or buildings, and its resources include a mix of historic and later structures and sometimes significant natural features.

As of 2022, there are 63 NHPs and 84 NHSs. Most NHPs and NHSs are managed by the National Park Service (NPS). Some federally designated sites are owned by local authorities or privately owned, but are authorized to request assistance from the NPS as affiliated areas. One property is managed by the U.S. Forest Service: Grey Towers National Historic Site.

As of October 15, 1966, all historic areas, including NHPs and NHSs, in the NPS are automatically listed on the National Register of Historic Places (NRHP). There are also about 90,000 NRHP sites, the large majority of which are neither owned nor managed by the NPS. Of these, about 2,500 have been designated at the highest status as National Historic Landmark (NHL) sites.

National Historic Sites

National Historic Sites are generally federally owned and administered properties, though some remain under private or local government ownership. There are currently 84 NHSs, of which 74 are official NPS units, 9 are NPS affiliated areas, and one managed by the U.S. Forest Service.

Derived from the Historic Sites Act of 1935, a number of NHSs were established by United States Secretaries of the Interior, but most have been authorized by acts of Congress. In 1937, the first NHS was created in Salem, Massachusetts, in order to preserve and interpret the maritime history of New England and the United States.

International Historic Site
There is one International Historic Site in the US park system, a unique designation given to Saint Croix Island, Maine, on the New Brunswick border. The title, given to the site of the first permanent French settlement in America, recognizes the influence that it has had on both Canada and the United States. The NPS does not distinguish among these designations in terms of their preservation or management policies.

National Historical Parks

In the United States, sites are "historic", while parks are "historical". The NPS explains that a site can be intrinsically historic, while a park is a modern legal invention. As such, a park is not itself "historic", but can be called "historical" when it contains historic resources. It is the resources which are historic, not the park. There are 63 national historical parks.

International Historical Park 
Klondike Gold Rush International Historical Park was formally established by the United States and Canada in 1998, the year of the centennial of the gold rush the park commemorates. The park comprises Klondike Gold Rush National Historical Park in Washington and Alaska, and Chilkoot Trail National Historic Site in British Columbia. It was this trail which so many prospectors took in hopes of making their fortunes in the Klondike River district of Yukon.

See also

National Historic Sites (Canada)
List of World Heritage Sites in the United States
List of areas in the United States National Park System
List of national monuments of the United States
List of national memorials of the United States

References

External links

 Designation of National Park System Units

 
 
Historic preservation in the United States

eo:Naciaj Historiaj Lokoj (Usono)
pt:Local histórico nacional